Stromile Emanuel Swift (born November 21, 1979) is an American former professional basketball player. He played college basketball for Louisiana State University (LSU) before being drafted second overall by the Vancouver Grizzlies in the 2000 NBA draft. At 6'10" and 220 lbs, he played the power forward and center positions.

College career 
Swift spent his college career at Louisiana State University, where he led the Tigers to the Sweet 16 round of the NCAA Men's Basketball Tournament his sophomore year, during the time when the LSU men's basketball program was under probation and had limited scholarships available.

Professional career

Vancouver / Memphis Grizzlies (2000–2005) 
Swift was selected second overall in the 2000 NBA draft by the Vancouver Grizzlies and was still with the team during its 2000 move to Memphis.

He competed in the 2001 Slam Dunk Competition against Baron Davis, DeShawn Stevenson, Corey Maggette, Desmond Mason and Jonathan Bender. Swift placed fourth as Mason, of the Seattle SuperSonics, won the competition.

On April 17, 2002, Swift scored a career-high 31 points and grabbed 10 rebounds in a loss against the Seattle SuperSonics.

Houston Rockets (2005–2006) 
After the 2004–05 season, Swift left the Grizzlies as a free agent and signed a four-year, $22 million contract with the Houston Rockets. At the time of his departure to Houston for the 2005–06 season, Swift was the last remaining player on the Grizzlies roster to have moved with the team from Vancouver.

Return to Memphis (2006–2008) 
In 2006, Swift was traded back to the Memphis Grizzlies along with the rights to the #8 draft pick Rudy Gay in exchange for Shane Battier, in a draft day trade. For some time, he was their starting center.

On January 3, 2007, Swift's 26 points helped lead (teammate Mike Miller had 33 points) the Grizzlies to a 144-135 victory against the Golden State Warriors.

New Jersey Nets (2008–2009) 
On February 4, 2008, Swift was traded to the New Jersey Nets for Jason Collins and cash considerations. Four days later, Swift played his first minutes with the Nets, scoring his first basket late in the game, on a jumper, against the Charlotte Bobcats. In the game against the Minnesota Timberwolves, on February 12, he scored on an alley-oop dunk from Jason Kidd, in the only game they would see time on the court together in a Nets uniform, as Kidd would be traded to the Dallas Mavericks shortly thereafter.

On March 1, 2009, Swift was waived by the Nets.

Phoenix Suns (2009) 
On March 4, 2009, the Suns signed Swift for the remainder of the season. In Phoenix, Swift played 13 games and averaged 2 points and 2.5 rebounds.

Swift's final NBA game ever was played on April 11, 2009, in a 110 - 97 win over the Minnesota Timberwolves where he recorded 2 points, 1 rebound a 1 block.

Shandong Lions (2009–2010) 
Swift signed with the Philadelphia 76ers in September 2009, but was released on October 12, 2009.

Swift signed with the Shandong Lions of the Chinese Basketball Association in December 2009, and made his debut the same month.

New Orleans Gators (2017) 
On August 29, 2017, Swift signed with the New Orleans Gators of the Global Mixed Gender Basketball League (GMGB).

NBA career statistics

Regular season

|-
| align="left" | 
| align="left" | Vancouver
| 80 || 6 || 16.4 || .451 || .000 || .603 || 3.6 || .4 || .8 || 1.0 || 4.9
|-
| align="left" | 
| align="left" | Memphis
| 68 || 14 || 26.5 || .480 || .000 || .711 || 6.3 || .7 || .8 || 1.7 || 11.8
|-
| align="left" | 
| align="left" | Memphis
| 67 || 26 || 22.1 || .481 || .000 || .722 || 5.7 || .7 || .8 || 1.6 || 9.7
|-
| align="left" | 
| align="left" | Memphis
| 77 || 10 || 19.8 || .469 || .250 || .725 || 4.9 || .5 || .7 || 1.5 || 9.4
|-
| align="left" | 
| align="left" | Memphis
| 60 || 14 || 21.3 || .449 || .000 || .758 || 4.6 || .7 || .7 || 1.5 || 10.1
|-
| align="left" | 
| align="left" | Houston
| 66 || 5 || 20.4 || .491 || .000 || .651 || 4.4 || .4 || .6 || .8 || 8.9
|-
| align="left" | 
| align="left" | Memphis
| 54 || 18 || 19.1 || .465 || .000 || .724 || 4.6 || .3 || .6 || 1.1 || 7.8
|-
| align="left" | 
| align="left" | Memphis
| 35 || 4 || 15.7 || .525 || .000 || .642 || 3.7 || .6 || .3 || 1.0 || 6.8
|-
| align="left" | 
| align="left" | New Jersey
| 21 || 0 || 14.0 || .477 || .000 || .750 || 3.3 || .2 || .2 || .9 || 5.0
|-
| align="left" | 
| align="left" | New Jersey
| 6 || 0 || 10.7 || .600 || .000 || .455 || 2.2 || .2 || .0 || .3 || 3.8
|-
| align="left" | 
| align="left" | Phoenix
| 13 || 0 || 9.3 || .366 || 1.000 || .533 || 2.5 || .2 || .3 || .5 || 3.0
|- class="sortbottom"
| style="text-align:center;" colspan="2"| Career
| 547 || 97 || 19.8 || .473 || .074 || .699 || 4.6 || .5 || .6 || 1.2 || 8.4

Playoffs

|-
| align="left" | 2004
| align="left" | Memphis
| 4 || 0 || 18.5 || .346 || .000 || .750 || 4.8 || .8 || .8 || 1.5 || 6.0
|-
| align="left" | 2005
| align="left" | Memphis
| 3 || 0 || 16.0 || .600 || .000 || .571 || 4.7 || .3 || .3 || .0 || 9.3
|- class="sortbottom"
| style="text-align:center;" colspan="2"| Career
| 7 || 0 || 17.4 || .457 || .000 || .667 || 4.7 || .6 || .6 || .9 || 7.4

Legal issues 
On February 22, 2011, Swift was arrested in his hometown of Shreveport, Louisiana, on charges of aggravated assault and improper telephone communications. He was later released on bail.

On May 20, 2011, Swift was arrested again in Shreveport on a charge of stalking. He pled guilty to the charge in July 2012 and received a suspended six-month sentence and a year and a half of supervised probation.

References

External links
Stromile Swift NBA bio
LSU Tigers bio
ClutchFans.net Stromile Swift Profile - Houston Rocket Fan Site
Yahoo Sports Player Profile

1979 births
Living people
African-American basketball players
All-American college men's basketball players
American expatriate basketball people in Canada
American expatriate basketball people in China
Basketball players from Shreveport, Louisiana
Houston Rockets players
LSU Tigers basketball players
McDonald's High School All-Americans
Memphis Grizzlies players
New Jersey Nets players
Parade High School All-Americans (boys' basketball)
Power forwards (basketball)
Shandong Hi-Speed Kirin players
Vancouver Grizzlies draft picks
Vancouver Grizzlies players
American men's basketball players
21st-century African-American sportspeople
20th-century African-American sportspeople